Objective abstraction was a British art movement c. 1933–1936.

History
Objective abstraction was a form of abstract art developed by a group of British artists in 1933. Experimentation was prevalent in British art at the time.

The main figures were Graham Bell, William Coldstream, Edgar Hubert, Rodrigo Moynihan and Geoffrey Tibble.

The movement was short-lived lasting only a few years. Many of the artists involved went on to be part of the realist Euston Road School.

Method
William Townsend told the Tate Gallery that 'the style originated with Geoffrey Tibble in the latter half of 1933. It was immediately taken up by Rodrigo Moynihan [...] and at the same time or shortly after by Edgar Hubert'. According to Townsend, early paintings by the group were derived from external objects but they became increasingly abstract.

The more abstract paintings, that came to represent the movements style, were created using improvised freely applied brushstrokes.

Exhibitions
In 1934, the exhibition Objective Abstractions was held at the Zwemmer Gallery showing the group's work, except Hubert's. The exhibition catalogue states that Graham Bell, Rodrigo Moynihan, Ceri Richards, Ivon Hitchens, Geoffrey Tibble and Victor Pasmore exhibited paintings

References

Art movements